The third season of The Real Housewives of Miami, an American reality television series, was broadcast on Bravo. It aired from 	August 12, 2013 until November 14, 2013 and was primarily filmed in Miami, Florida. Its executive producers are Matt Anderson, Nate Green and Andy Cohen.

The Real Housewives of Miami focuses on the lives of Lea Black, Adriana De Moura, Alexia Echevarria, Lisa Hochstein and Joanna Krupa. It consisted of sixteen episodes.

Production and crew
A third season was confirmed when controversy arose when the production company, Purveyors of Pop, proposed using drones to film B-roll aerial shots. Season 3 was officially announced the renewal of The Real Housewives of Miami on April 2, 2013. The cast and the premiere date were officially revealed on June 24, 2013. The reunion for the third season was filmed in New York City on October 17, 2013, and later aired in two-parts.

The season premiered with "Til Lies Do Us Part" on August 12, 2013, while the fourteenth episode "Mrs. Zago" served as the season finale, and was aired on November 4, 2013. It was followed by a two-part reunion special that aired on November 11, and November 14, 2013 which marked the conclusion of the season. Matt Anderson, Nate Green and Andy Cohen are recognized as the series' executive producers; it is produced and distributed by Purveyors of Pop.

The third season is the last season of The Real Housewives of Miami to air and has not been on air until 2021. In an article published by Bravo's The Daily Dish on September 29, 2016, it stated that the Real Housewives of Miami had "ended".

Cast and synopsis
Four of the seven housewives featured on the second season of The Real Housewives of Miami returned for the third installment. Karent Sierra, who joined during the second season, was let go from the series due to being bicoastal, filming The Doctors in L.A., as well as casting for some films. Marysol Patton and Ana Quincoces, who respectively joined the series during the first and second seasons, were both reduced to a recurring role. Original cast member Alexia Echevarria returned to the series in full capacity after being reduced to a recurring in season 2.
Throughout the season, rival cast members, Joanna Krupa and Adriana De Moura's feud was at an all-time high as they were planning for their wedding.

 During her appearance, Patton was seated on the end of the right couch, next to Black.

Episodes

References

External links
 
 

The Real Housewives of Miami
2013 American television seasons